The Mariano Marcos State University also referred to by its acronym MMSU, is a higher education institution with campuses and facilities throughout Ilocos Norte province in the Philippines. Its main campus is in Batac.

History
Established on January 6, 1976, by virtue of PD 1279 otherwise known as its Charter, Mariano Marcos State University was a merger of two growing state colleges in the province of Ilocos Norte: the Mariano Marcos Memorial College of Science and Technology (MMMCST) in Batac and the Northern Luzon State College (NLSC) in Laoag City. Also integrated were the tertiary level courses of the Ilocos Norte Agricultural College in Pasuquin and the Ilocos Norte College of Arts and Trades in Laoag. Predecessor institutions have existed as far back as the early 1900s.

Founding
MMMCST (1974) was founded as the Batac Farm School in 1906. It metamorphosed into the Batac Rural High School in 1918, the Ilocos Norte Institute of Technology in 1964 and MMMCST in 1974. The Currimao School of Fisheries, the Dingras National Agricultural School and the Ilocos Norte School for Craftsman in Paoay formed its satellite campuses.

On the other hand, NLSC started as an experimental vacation school of the Philippine Normal School in 1917. As its enrolment grew and its offerings became upgraded, it was renamed the Ilocos Norte Normal School in 1952, the Northern Luzon Teachers College in 1963 and NLSC in 1976.

It became an active member of the International Association of Universities (IAU), the International Association of Institutions of Higher Learning (ASAIHL), and the Association of Technological Education in the ASEAN (ATEAN). The United States Information Service (USIS) through the Thomas Jefferson Cultural Center selected MMSU as seat of the American Studies Resource Center (ASRC) in Northern Luzon. These strong foundations were laid during the administration of Consuelo Blanco, the first president, whose leadership spanned from 1978 to 1983.

Renaming
In 2019, there are plans to rename the university to Ferdinand E. Marcos State University, to stop the confusion between the two same named Universities. The law was passed to final reading.

Student publication
SIRMATA is the official publication of the college students of Mariano Marcos State University. It is the oldest existing student publication in region 1, founded by Dr. Sosimo Ma. Pablico.

In 2010, the publication conducted its first SMAP Journalism Workshop in honor of its founder and holds an annual gathering for student journalists.

There are also existing publications of the different units of the university.

Literary folio
In 1998, the first ever literary journal separate and distinct from the regular tabloid issuance of Sirmata was produced. The first consolidation and production of a literary journal entitled "Anthology" was spearheaded by Sirmata literary editor Florante Nicolas, also a BS Development Communication student who was also the concurrent editor-in-chief of "The Sentinel" (MMSU- College of Agriculture and Forestry student's publication). Thereafter, succeeding literary editors of Sirmata produced an annual series of literary collection.

Location
MMSU is in Ilocos Norte, a province in the northwestern part of Luzon Island, Philippines. Its main campus of about 300 hectares is in Batac,  from Manila.

MMSU maintains five other campuses. These are in Batac (main campus), Laoag City (two campuses), Currimao, Dingras, and Paoay. In Laoag is the College of Education or the College of Teacher Education and the College of Industrial Technology.

Integrated University Laboratory Schools
MMSU has high school departments. In July 2009, these high school departments went out from their mother colleges to form the Integrated University Laboratory Schools (IULS). UHS has two campuses: Laboratory High School - Laoag Campus and the University High School - Science Curriculum (also known as MMSU Science High School or Laboratory High School - Science Curriculum) in Batac.

LHS Laoag is known for debate tournaments both national and international arenas. SHS Batac is known for having an advanced curriculum and academic excellence similar to the curriculum used by the Philippine Science High School and the DOST-accredited high schools. Science classes were formed through a Memorandum of Agreement between MMSU and Philippine Science High School during the administration of Dr. Santiago Obien. SHS has been active in joining various contests of different fields and have gathered numerous awards.

Laboratory Elementary School
The Laboratory Elementary School of the university (MMSU-LES) has two campuses: one in Laoag City and a new campus in Batac, which comprises nursery, kindergarten and grades 1–3. It is said that the campus in Batac will add one level every school year until grade six. LES is known for academic excellence and for their performance in provincial, regional, and national contests.

Performing arts
Nasudi Chorale
Nasudi Dance Troupe
Bin-I Dance Troupe (CTE)

Athletics
MMSU Stallions varsity teams:

Presidents 
 Dr. Consuelo S. Blanco, June 1978–May 1983: New academic units were created and program offerings were re-engineered in harmony with its vision and mission. Highly qualified faculty was recruited them to reputable institutions in the country and abroad. It became an active member of the International Association of Universities (IAU), the International Association of Institutions of Higher Learning (ASAIHL), and the Association of Technological Education in the ASEAN (ATEAN). The United States Information Service (USIS) through the Thomas Jefferson Cultural Center also selected MMSU as seat of the American Studies Resource Center (ASRC) in Northern Luzon. These strong foundations were laid during the administration of Dr. Consuelo S. Blanco, first president, whose leadership spanned the period from 1978 to 1983.
Dr. Santiago R. Obien, June 1983–May 1986: Obien's term enlarged the coast in research and extension and consolidated curricular offerings in the different campuses. Committed to bringing about a better life and education for all including farmers, homemakers and out-of-school youth, he launched the thrust on formal and non-formal education for technology transfer in agriculture, fisheries, arts and trades.
Dr. Felipe B. Cachola, June 1986–May 1993: The stewardship of Cachola was guided by a transparent and participative management. Notable of which was the implementation of the United Nations Development Program–Food and Agriculture Organization (UNDP-FAO)–MMSU Project: "Strengthening the Development of Dryland Agriculture in the Ilocos" at the university forest reservation in Bgys. Payao and Sarnap, Batac. The accreditation by the Accrediting Agency for Chartered Colleges and Universities of the Philippines (AACCUP) raised the quality of its offerings in education and agriculture both in the undergraduate and graduate levels. Key officials and middle-level management participated in a mobile seminar that brought them to SUCs in Luzon and Visayas.
Dr. Elias L. Calacal, June 1993–May 1999: The leadership of Calacal brought on projects that effectively used hilly lands and sand dunes. The university was distinguished as Center of Excellence for Teacher Education in Region I while several programs reached Level II or III AACCUP accreditation. Facilities were improved and underused spaces were converted into well-furnished convention venues or dormitories. The theater was provided with non-expensive indigenous acoustic materials (fiberboard egg trays on the sides and ceilings, which proved to be decorative) and renamed Teatro Ilocandia.
Dr. Saturnino M. Ocampo Jr., June 1999–December 2004: Ocampo's term provided the culture of discipline especially on financial and time management; self-reliance; and observance of the 5S as an approach to achieving excellence. Course offerings were revised with the closure of non-performing ones. With board-approved organizational structure, unit heads were afforded the freedom to innovate, initiate reforms and make appropriate decisions. This resulted to three more centers of excellence/development, the conferment of scientist positions to five professors, outstanding performance in licensure exams, and quality refurbishment of physical facilities.1964
Dr. Miriam E. Pascua, May 2005–2014: During the term of Dr. Pascua, the first known university core values has been established although it has changed since then. 
Dr. Shirley C. Agrupis, August 2017 – present

See also
 List of forestry universities and colleges

References

 http://www.mmsu.edu.ph/
https://web.archive.org/web/20120616150444/http://www.mb.com.ph/node/113592

External links
 http://www.mmsu.edu.ph/

Universities and colleges in Ilocos Norte
State universities and colleges in the Philippines
Philippine Association of State Universities and Colleges
Schools in Laoag
Establishments by Philippine presidential decree